Patricia Maldonado (born November 15, 1991) is a long-distance and open water swimmer from Venezuela. She has swum for Venezuela at the:
2008 Open Water Worlds (5K)
2008 South American Championships
2009 World Championships (5K and 10K)

References

Living people
1991 births
Venezuelan female swimmers
21st-century Venezuelan women